Kluge's law is a controversial Proto-Germanic sound law formulated by Friedrich Kluge. It purports to explain the origin of the Proto-Germanic long consonants *kk, *tt, and *pp (Proto-Indo-European lacked a phonemic length distinction for consonants) as originating in the assimilation of *n to a preceding voiced plosive consonant, under the condition that the *n was part of a suffix which was stressed in the ancestral Proto-Indo-European (PIE). The name "Kluge's law" was coined by Kauffmann (1887) and revived by Frederik Kortlandt (1991). As of 2006, this law has not been generally accepted by historical linguists.

The resulting long consonants would subsequently have been shortened, except when they followed a short vowel; this is uncontroversial for *ss (which has a different origin). Proponents of Kluge's law use this to explain why so many Proto-Germanic roots (especially of strong verbs) end in short *p, *t, or *k even though their likely cognates in other Indo-European languages point to final Proto-Indo-European (PIE) consonants other than the expected *b, *d, *g, or *ǵ. (Indeed, non-Germanic evidence for PIE *b is so rare that *b may not have been a phoneme at all; yet, in Proto-Germanic, *p was rare only at the beginnings of words.)

Much like Verner's law, Kluge's law would have created many consonant alternations in the grammatical paradigm of a word that were becoming only partially predictable. Analogical simplifications of these complexities are proposed as an explanation for the many cases where closely related (often otherwise identical) words point to short, long, plosive, fricative, voiceless or voiced Proto-Germanic consonants in closely related Germanic languages or dialects, even sometimes the same dialect.

Assimilation (Kluge's law proper)

The origin of Proto-Germanic (PGmc) *ll, *rr, *nn, and *mm had already been explained in Kluge's time  as resulting from the assimilation of consonant clusters across earlier morpheme boundaries: *ll from earlier (Pre-Germanic) *l-n, *rr from earlier *r-n, *nn from earlier *n-n and *n-w, *mm from earlier *z-m and *n-m. This is uncontroversial today, except that *r-n may not have given *rr in every case. A few examples with *-n are:

 PGmc *fullaz < PIE *pl̥h₁-nó-s > Sanskrit pūrṇá- (all meaning "full")
 PGmc *wullō- < PIE *h₂wl̥h₂-neh₂- > Sanskrit ūrṇā- (all meaning "wool")
 PGmc *ferrai ("far") < PIE perH-noi > Lithuanian pérnai ("last year")
 German Welle, Old High German wella < PIE wel-neh₂- (e-grade); Russian волна /volˈna/ < PIE wl̥-neh₂- (zero-grade) (all meaning "wave")

Kluge (1884) proposed to explain *pp, *tt, and *kk the same way (examples cited after Kroonen 2011):

 PGmc *lappōn- < PIE *lHbʰ-néh₂- > Latin lambō (all meaning "to lick")
 Middle Dutch roppen, Middle High German and later rupfen (both "to pluck, tear off") < PIE *Hrup-néh₂- > Latin rumpō ("I break")
 PGmc *buttaz (genitive singular) < PIE *bʰudʰ-no- > Sanskrit budʰná-, Latin fundus (all meaning "bottom")
 PGmc *stuttōn- < PIE *(s)tud-n- > Latin tundō (all meaning "to bump into something")
 PGmc *likkōn- < PIE *liǵʰ-n- > Ancient Greek λιχνεύω /likʰˈneu̯ɔː/, Latin lingō (all meaning "to lick")
 PGmc *þakkōn- "to pat" < PIE *th₂g-n- > Latin tangō "I touch"

Without Kluge's law, **-bn-, **-pn-, **-dn-, **-tn-, **-gn-, and **-kn- would be expected, respectively, in the Germanic forms (according to Grimm's law and Verner's law).

Predictable exceptions

Kluge's law did not operate behind stressed vowels, only in the same environment as Verner's law. Examples cited are after Kroonen (2009, 2011):

 PGmc *ufna- ("oven") < PIE *úp-no-
 PGmc *tafna- ("sacrifice", "meal") < PIE *dh₂p-no- > Latin damnum ("detriment"), Ancient Greek δαπάνη /daˈpanɛː/ ("expenditure")
 PGmc *swefna- < PIE *swép-no- > Sanskrit svápna-, Latin somnus (all "sleep", "dream")
 PGmc *aþna- < PIE *h₂ét-no- > Latin annus (all "year")
 PGmc *watn- < PIE *wéd-n- ("water"; *-r- in the nominative, *-n- in the genitive)>  Latin unda ("wave", "[mass of] water")
 PGmc *laihna- ("borrowed goods") < PIE *lóikʷ-no- > Sanskrit rékṇas- ("inheritance", "wealth")
 PGmc *wagna- < PIE *wóǵʰ-no- ("wagon")

Also, even when that condition was fulfilled, Kluge's law did not act on the descendants of PIE *s (PGmc *z following Verner's law). Examples cited after Kroonen (2009, 2011):

 PGmc *razna- ("house") < PIE *Hros-nó-
 PGmc *twizna- ("double thread") < PIE *dwis-nó-
 PGmc *liznōn- ("to learn") < PIE *lis-néh₂- ("to make oneself know", a mediopassive causative)
 PGmc *aznō- ("work") < PIE *h₂es-néh₂-
 PGmc genitive singular *uhsniz, genitive plural *uhsnǫ̂, accusative plural *uhsnunz < PIE *uks-n-és, *uks-n-óHom, uks-én-n̥s ("ox's, oxen's, oxen")

Shortening of long consonants in overlong syllables

The rise of long consonant phonemes left the Pre-Germanic language with three kinds of syllables:
 short: with a short vowel, followed by a short consonant in the next syllable
 long: with a long vowel, a diphthong or a short vowel + *l/*m/*n/*r, followed by a short consonant in the next syllableor a short vowel followed by a long consonant that spanned the syllable boundary
 overlong: with a long vowel, a diphthong or a short vowel + *l/*m/*n/*r followed by a long consonant that spanned the syllable boundary

In other words, syllables could be long because of the specific vowel (or a following *l/*m/*n/*r), or because a long consonant from the next syllable bled in. If both occurred, the syllable was overlong. See Mora (linguistics), which suggests that such overlong syllables are cross-linguistically rare.

All overlong syllables were then turned into long syllables by shortening the long consonant. This is uncontroversial for *ss, which derives from PIE *t-t, *d-t and *dʰ-t clusters across morpheme boundaries (which were probably pronounced [tst] in PIE):

 Without shortening (short vowel followed by long consonant): PGmc *wissaz "certain" < PIE *wid-tó-s "known"
 With shortening (long vowel followed by originally long consonant): PGmc *wīsa- "wise" < PIE *weid-tó- > Latin vīsus "seen"
 With shortening (diphthong followed by originally long consonant): PGmc *haisiz "command" < PIE *káid-tis "act of calling"

Kluge (1884: 183) proposed to extend this explanation to cases where Proto-Germanic roots that constituted long syllables ended in *p, *t, or *k, while different consonants at the same places of articulation would be expected based on apparently related roots (in PGmc or other Indo-European branches). Examples cited after Kroonen (2011):

 PGmc *deupa- ("deep") as if from PIE *-b-; Lithuanian dubùs ("deep", "hollow") from PIE *-bʰ-
 PGmc *skēpa- ("sheep"), but *skaban- ("to scrape/shear/shave")
 PGmc *hwīta- as if from PIE *-d-; Sanskrit śvetá-, śvítna- from PIE *-t- (all meaning "white")
 PGmc *wantu- ("glove/mitten"), but *windan- ("to wind")
 PGmc *dīka- ("dam/dike", "pool") as if from PIE *-g- or -ǵ-; Ancient Greek τεῖχος /ˈtêːkʰɔs/ ("wall") from PIE *-gʰ- or *-ǵʰ-
 PGmc *taikjan- as if from PIE *-g- or -ǵ-; Ancient Greek δείκνῡμι /ˈděːknyːmi/ from PIE *-k- or *-ḱ- (all meaning "to show")

Consequences for Proto-Germanic morphology

Kluge's law had a noticeable effect on Proto-Germanic morphology. Because of its dependence on ablaut and accent, it operated in some parts of declension and conjugation, but not in others, giving rise to alternations of short and long consonants in both nominal and verbal paradigms. Kroonen (2009, 2011) compared these alternations to grammatischer Wechsel (the alternation of voiced and voiceless fricatives in Proto-Germanic, caused by Verner's law) and especially to the consonant gradation of the neighboring Finnic and Sami languages. This is most conspicuous in the n-stem nouns and the "néh₂-presents" (imperfective verbs formed from perfective ones by adding the PIE suffix *néh₂-/*nh₂-), but also occurs in mn-stems and directional adverbs.

n-stem nouns

Kluge's law created long consonants in the genitive singular, which ended in *-n-és in PIE, and in the genitive plural (*-n-óHom). It did not operate in the dative plural: although the *n of *-n̥-mis was in direct contact with the root in PIE, it was syllabic, so it became *-un- early on the way to Proto-Germanic (soon assimilated to *-ummiz), preventing the operation of Kluge's law.

Schematic (after Kroonen 2009: 32), where C represents the initial and the final consonant of the root, and G represents its Verner variant if it had one:

Example:

Naturally, this led to three different kinds of consonant alternation (examples after Kroonen 2009):

The nominative singular of roots ending in plosives thus became difficult to predict from the cases where Kluge's law had operated; and the pure length opposition was more common than the others, because it was not limited to plosives.

mn-stem nouns

In PIE, such words regularly would have had a nominative singular in *-mḗn and a genitive in *-mn-és. However, in the genitive singular, it appears that the *-m- dropped out of the middle of the resulting three-consonant cluster already in PIE, making the mn-stems look like n-stems: PIE *bʰudʰ-mēn, *bʰudʰ-mn-és > *bʰudʰmēn, *bʰudʰnés ("bottom") > Greek πυθμήν /pytʰˈmɛ̌ːn/ from the nominative, but Sanskrit budʰná- and Latin fundus from the genitive. This would have allowed assimilation of *n to the now preceding consonant; Kroonen (2011) proposed that this happened in such words, yielding e.g. PGmc *budmēn, *buttiz ("bottom").

Directional adverbs

In addition to prepositions that indicated relative locations (such as "in" or "over"), Proto-Germanic had a large set of directional adverbs: "locative" ones (with meanings such as "inside" or "on top"), "allative" ones (with meanings such as "into" or "up") and "ablative" ones (with meanings such as "out from the inside" or "down from above"). Many, but not all of these forms had long consonants. Kroonen (2011, 2012) reconstructed examples like this and attributed them to Kluge's law:

néh₂-"present" verbs: iteratives

Chronology

The law has sparked discussions about its chronology in relation to Grimm's law and Verner's law. The problem is that the traditional ordering (1. Grimm, 2. Verner, 3. Kluge) cannot account for the absence of voice in the Proto-Germanic geminates. Therefore, it has been proposed to rearrange the order of events so that the Proto-Germanic geminates' loss of voice may be equated with that part of Grimm's law that turns mediae into voiceless tenues. This would mean that characteristics noted in Kluge's law happened before (or between different phases of) those of Grimm's law. If accepted, this has further consequences, because those characteristics of Verner's law must in fact, precede those of Kluge's law, or otherwise it can not be explained why both the reflexes of PIE voiced aspirated plosives and PIE voiceless plosives underwent the changes characteristic in Kluge's law. Consequently, this would put Verner's law chronologically in the first position, followed by Kluge's, and finally by Grimm's law.

Under the updated view, the processes may be summarized by the following table:

Criticism

Soon after the initial publications (Osthoff 1882; Kluge 1884), Kluge's law came to be considered an unnecessary hypothesis by several authors. With rather few exceptions, introductory texts have ignored it, and more detailed works on Proto-Germanic have generally dismissed it rather briefly; "it has been seriously challenged throughout the 20th century, and nowadays even borders on the uncanonical in both Indo-European and Germanic linguistics" (Kroonen 2009: 53).

Lack of evidence

Beginning with Trautmann (1906), several authors (e.g. Kuryłowicz 1957: 133–134; Fagan 1989: 38; Ringe 2006: 115) have stated that there are very few or no cases where a Proto-Germanic root with a long plosive corresponds to, or is best explained as corresponding to, a PIE root followed by a suffix that began with n.

Lühr (1988) and Kroonen (2011) countered by presenting long lists of examples, especially (as they point out) of n-stem nouns.

Expressive gemination

Onomatopoetic roots often end in a long plosive in Germanic languages. Examples (Kroonen 2011: 125) include the Old Norse words klappa "to clap", okka "to sigh", and skvakka "to make a gurgling sound", Old Swedish kratta and modern German kratzen "to scratch", modern Norwegian tikka "to tap", Old Frisian kloppa and modern German klopfen "to knock", and Old English cluccian "to cluck". Long consonants more generally are ubiquitous in Germanic nicknames such as Old English Totta from Torhthelm, Beoffa from Beornfriþ, Blæcca for a black-haired man (note the short  in blæc), Eadda (and German Otto) from all names with Proto-Germanic *Auda- (Gąsiorowski 2006 and references therein), a long list of Gothic ones whose referents are often difficult or impossible to reconstruct (Ibba, Faffo, Mammo, Oppa, Riggo, Wacca, etc.; possibly also atta, meaning "father"), German ones such as – accounting for the High German consonant shift – Fritz (*Fritta(n)-) from Friedrich, Lutz (*(H)lutta(n)-) from Ludwig, and Sicko (*Sikkan-) from Si(e)gmar, and finally Icelandic Solla from Sólrún, Magga from Margrét, Nonni from Jón, Stebbi from Stefán, Mogga from Morgunblaðið, and lögga "cop" from lögreglan "the police"; Gąsiorowski (2006) further proposed to explain the otherwise enigmatic English words dog, pig, frog, stag, (ear)wig, and Old English sucga "dunnock" and * ~ * "young sheep" (not attested in the nominative singular) as nicknames formed to various nouns or adjectives. Some authors, such as Trautmann (1906) and Fagan (1989), have tried to ascribe all long plosives of Proto-Germanic to "intensive" or "expressive gemination" on the basis of the idea that the roots that contained them had meanings connected to emotions, including intensity and iteration; this idea, first formulated by Gerland (1869 – long before Kluge published), was accepted e.g. in the extremely influential, Indogermanisches etymologisches Wörterbuch (Pokorny 1959) as well as the more specialist works of Seebold (1970) and Kluge & Seebold (2002), and was considered "still perhaps the most widely accepted explanation" by Ringe (2006: 115).

Lühr (1988) and Rasmussen (1989b), approvingly cited by Kroonen (2011), as well as Kortlandt (1991), countered that most nouns with long plosives or evidence of consonant gradation did not have meanings that would fit this hypothesis. The same works pointed out that "expressive gemination" does not explain why so many of these nouns are n-stems. Moreover, expressive gemination cannot explain the many cases where Proto-Germanic  correspond to PIE  (as in Old English liccian "to lick" from PIE *leiǵh-, where **licgian would be expected in OE; Gąsiorowski 2012: 17), it cannot explain Proto-Germanic  corresponding to PIE  (as in Old English dēop from PIE *dheubh-; Kortlandt 1991: 3, Kroonen 2011: 128, Gąsiorowski 2012: 16), and it cannot explain Proto-Germanic  corresponding to PIE  (as in Middle Dutch token "to push" from PIE *duk-), while Kluge's law followed by analogy has no problem with such phenomena (Kroonen 2011: 125). Kroonen (2011: 125) added: "Moreover, the Expressivity Theory [sic] seems to contain a critical theoretical fallacy. It is a priori implausible that a completely new range of phonemes (i.e. geminates) could be introduced into a linguistic system by extra-linguistic factors such as charged semantics. In this respect, some versions of the Expressivity Theory are truly comparable to what in biology is known as Aristotle's generatio spontanea hypothesis [...], which revolved around the idea that living organisms, such as flies and eels, come about spontaneously in decaying corpses." Finally, the nicknames with long consonants (including Gothic atta) are n-stems; n-stem nicknames occur in other Indo-European branches as well, such as Latin Catō, Varrō, Nerō and Greek Platōn, Strabōn, and "Germanic has many personalizing or individualizing n-stems that are structurally identical with the hypocorisms [nicknames], e.g. OHG chresso 'groundling' to chresan 'to crawl' (Kuryłowicz 1957) [...]" (Kroonen 2011: 82).

Most of the Proto-Germanic long plosives are voiceless; but while long voiced plosives were rare, they do have to be reconstructed in a few cases. The hypothesis of expressive gemination has trouble explaining this, as Trautmann (1906: 66) admitted while rejecting Kluge's law: "Wie wir uns freilich das Nebeneinander von z. B. kk- gg- k- g- zu erklären haben, weiss ich nicht" – 'I do not know, however, how we ought to explain the coexistence of e.g. kk- gg- k- g-'. Kroonen (2011: 124): "The only existing theory that is powerful enough   to explain  such root variations, is the one that acknowledges consonant gradation and the underlying mechanism of the paradigmatic contaminations. The co-occurrence of ON riga 'to lift heavily' : MLG wriggen 'to twist' : ME wricken 'to wiggle', for instance, implies two different expressive formations within the Expressivity Theory, the choice between a voiced and voiceless geminate being arbitrary, erratic, or, in other words, scientifically unfalsifiable. By reconstructing a paradigm *wrikkōþi, *wrigunanþi < *uriḱ-néh₂-ti, *uriḱ-nh₂-énti, on the other hand, the only irregular form is *wrigg-, which may be explained readily by contamination of *wrig- and *wrikk-."

Similarly, Gąsiorowski (2012: 21) felt that it was "methodologically unsound to invoke" "psycholinguistic factors" and other hypotheses of irregular development "until we have tried everything else", in this case, a regular sound law such as Kluge's. Kroonen (2009: 53) pointed out that, by virtue of having first been published in 1869, the hypothesis of expressive gemination "basically stems from the time before the rise of the Neogrammarian doctrine of Ausnahmslosigkeit der Lautgesetze" ('exceptionlessness of the sound laws').

Substrate influence

As pointed out above, long consonants did not exist in Proto-Indo-European, and many Germanic roots are attested with a long consonant in some of the ancient languages, but with a short one in others (often together with a short or a long vowel, respectively). This led the "Leiden School" to postulate that the Germanic roots with long plosives were not inherited from PIE, but borrowed from a substrate language. Kroonen (2011: 12) reported that his doctorate at the University of Leiden was originally intended

to investigate the influence of lost non-Indo-European languages on the Proto-Germanic lexicon. [...] During the course of time, however, my dissertation gradually developed into a study of the Proto-Germanic n-stems and their typical morphology. The reason for this change of direction was that the most important formal criterion that had been used in order to isolate non-Indo-European words from the rest of the lexicon – the Proto-Germanic geminates – turned out to be significantly overrepresented in this morphological category.
     The advocates of the Leiden Substrate Theory had defined the typical Germanic cross-dialectal interchange of singulate and geminate roots as the prime indicator of prehistoric language contact. For this reason, this substrate language had even been dubbed the "Language of the Geminates". Yet, beside the fact that geminates were not at all distributed randomly across the vocabulary, as would be expected in the case of language contact, the interchanges proved to be far from erratic. In fact, they turned out to be strikingly predictable in nature.

While it is by no means impossible that there was "a substrate language with geminates", or even "that Kluge's law was triggered by the absorption of speakers of this substrate language into the PIE dialect that ultimately became known as Germanic", Kroonen (2009: 62) found no evidence for such hypotheses and stressed that a long consonant in a Germanic root may not be taken as evidence that this root was borrowed.

Timing

Long plosives are very rare in the known Gothic material; other than the abovementioned nicknames (including atta), they are attested only in skatts ("money"), smakka ("fig"; n-stem) and the Latin loanword, sakkus ("sack") (Kroonen 2011). Therefore, Kuryłowicz (1957) and Fagan (1989) argued that long plosives were absent in Proto-Germanic and only arose in Proto-Northwest Germanic – so that, if Kluge's law exists at all, it must have operated between Proto-Germanic and Proto-Northwest Germanic, not between Proto-Indo-European and Proto-Germanic.

Lühr (1988) and Kroonen (2011) have pointed out that strong verbs with  following a long vowel, diphthong or "resonant" are common in the Gothic Bible, and that many of these are clearly related to iteratives with long consonants that are attested in Northwest Germanic languages. Kroonen (2011: 82, 111) further drew attention to the fact that the Old Saxon Heliand, an epic poem about the life of Jesus, contains only three words with long plosives of potentially Proto-Germanic origin (skatt "treasure, money", likkōn "to lick"; upp, uppa, uppan "on top", "up", "down from above"), while such words "are ever-present in Middle Low German", and approvingly cited the hypothesis by Kuryłowicz (1957: 140) that words with long plosives were considered stylistically inappropriate for a Christian religious work because long plosives were so common in nicknames – they may have sounded too colloquial and informal. Gothic is almost exclusively known from the surviving parts of a Bible translation and from fragments of a commentary on the Gospel of John.

References 

Sound laws